The Assembly at Wanstead House is a c. 1728–1732 group portrait by the English artist William Hogarth. It is now in the collection of the Philadelphia Museum of Art in Philadelphia, Pennsylvania.

Description

The painting is believed to have been commissioned to record the 25th wedding anniversary of Richard Child, Viscount Castlemain and his wife Dorothy Glynne Child.

It shows the Viscount in the Long Ballroom of his newly built Wanstead House, seated at an ornate tea-table with his 2 eldest daughters at far right foreground, wearing a red coat. His wife, ostensibly the central figure of the painting,  suddenly turns away from her card game pointing towards him her card the ace of spades, an allusion to her guests and to the viewer that her husband was her winning card; thus does Hogarth bring  his patron, the apparently compositionally modestly placed peer into centre-stage. The younger 3 children form a group in the left foreground.

References

External links
http://www.philamuseum.org/collections/permanent/103800.html

1720s paintings
1730s paintings
Paintings by William Hogarth
18th-century portraits
Group portraits by English artists
Paintings in the collection of the Philadelphia Museum of Art